{{safesubst:#invoke:RfD||2=MK Pictures|month = March
|day =  8
|year = 2023
|time = 22:00
|timestamp = 20230308220035

|content=
REDIRECT Myung Films

}}